Stig-Göran Myntti (6 August 1925 – 28 February 2020) was a Finnish footballer and bandy player. He was part of Finland's football squad at the 1952 Summer Olympics.

Football career
Myntti earned 61 caps at international level between 1945 and 1958, scoring 5 goals. At club level Myntti played for VPS, Vasa IFK and RU-38. He scored 121 goals in 250 Mestaruussarja matches.

Bandy career
Myntti capped 12 times and scored 4 goals at international level.

Honours

Football
Finnish Championship: 1944, 1946, 1953
Mestaruussarja Top Scorer: 1948

Bandy
Bandy World Championship: Runner-up: 1957

External links

References

1925 births
2020 deaths
Finnish footballers
Finland international footballers
Olympic footballers of Finland
Footballers at the 1952 Summer Olympics
Finnish bandy players
RU-38 (sports club) players
Association football forwards
Vasa IFK players
Mestaruussarja players